"Silent Night: A Benefit for Feeding America" is a digital solo piano single released in December 2013 by pianist George Winston. The proceeds from the single, which was inspired by both Joseph Byrd's version from his 1975 album, A Christmas Yet to Come, as well as the playing of the New Orleans R&B pianist Professor Longhair,  are donated to Feeding America, the nationwide network of food banks that feeds 37 million people.

Track listing

References

External links
Liner Notes (PDF)

2013 singles
Christmas charity singles
George Winston albums